Cazenovia High School is a public high school located in Cazenovia, New York. It is operated by Cazenovia Central School District.

Notable alumni
 Gennaro DiNapoli, former NFL player
 Steve Suhey, former NFL player

References

External links
Cazenovia High School Official site

Public high schools in New York (state)
Schools in Madison County, New York